Anatrachyntis lunulifera is a moth in the family Cosmopterigidae. It was described by Edward Meyrick in 1934, and is known from the Marquesas Archipelago.

References

Moths described in 1934
Anatrachyntis
Moths of Oceania